William Herbert Withington (February 1, 1835 – June 27, 1903) was a Union Army officer during the American Civil War.

Biography
William H. Withington was born at Dorchester, Massachusetts on February 1, 1835. He moved to Michigan and became a farm implement manufacturer.

In May 1861, Withington enlisted as a captain of the 1st Michigan Volunteer Infantry Regiment (3 Months). He was wounded and captured at the First Battle of Bull Run on July 21, 1861. He was exchanged and mustered out of the volunteers on January 31, 1862. He was appointed colonel of the 17th Michigan Volunteer Infantry Regiment on August 11, 1862. He resigned from the volunteers on March 31, 1863.

On December 3, 1867, President Andrew Johnson nominated Withington for appointment to the grade of brevet brigadier general of volunteers, to rank from March 13, 1865, for his service at the Battle of South Mountain, and the United States Senate confirmed the appointment on February 14, 1868.

After the war, Withington founded the Withington and Cooley Manufacturing Company, a maker of agricultural implements, in Jackson, Michigan.  Withington served in the Michigan House of Representatives from 1873 to 1874, and the Michigan State Senate from 1891 to 1892. 

On January 7, 1895, Withington was awarded the Medal of Honor for his actions at the First Battle of Bull Run where he remained on the field and took command from his wounded superior officer, Orlando B. Willcox, until he too was wounded and eventually captured.

William H. Withington died at Jackson, Michigan, June 27, 1903. He was buried at Mount Evergreen Cemetery, Jackson, Michigan.

See also

List of American Civil War Medal of Honor recipients: T–Z
List of American Civil War brevet generals (Union)

References

Union Army colonels
1835 births
1903 deaths
American Civil War recipients of the Medal of Honor
Members of the Michigan House of Representatives
Michigan state senators
United States Army Medal of Honor recipients
19th-century American politicians